The 1997 Czech Republic motorcycle Grand Prix was the twelfth round of the 1997 Grand Prix motorcycle racing season. It took place on 31 August 1997 at the Masaryk Circuit located in Brno, Czech Republic. A young Valentino Rossi took his first title at this track by finishing in 3rd place a year after winning his first race here in 1996

500 cc classification

250 cc classification

125 cc classification

References

Czech Republic motorcycle Grand Prix
Czech Republic
Motorcycle Grand Prix